Pagyda calida is a moth in the family Crambidae. It was described by George Hampson in 1898. It is found on Peninsular Malaysia and Borneo.

The wingspan is about 24 mm. Adults are deep brownish orange.

References

Moths described in 1899
Pyraustinae